Eugen Arturovich Kapp ( – 29 October 1996) was an Estonian composer and music educator. Characterized by simple harmonies, march rhythms and an appealing melodic style, his music is reflective upon the musical ideas favoured by the Stalinist regime of the 1940s and 1950s. He is best remembered today for his contribution to Russian opera.

Born in Astrakhan, in the Astrakhan Governorate of the Russian Empire, Kapp was the son of Artur Kapp, also a composer and teacher. His first cousin was the composer, organist and music teacher Villem Kapp. Kapp studied under his father at the Tallinn Conservatory and graduated from there in 1931. Four years later he joined the adjunct faculty at the Conservatory where he taught music theory and composition. He won the Stalin Prize in 1946 for his opera Tasuleegid (‘Fire of Revenge’). In 1947 he was appointed a full professor at the Conservatory, acting as rector from 1952 to 1964. Several of Kapp's students, such as Eino Tamberg, went on to have successful careers. From 1948 to 1965, Kapp served as chairman of the Estonian Composers' Union. In 1950 he was awarded a Stalin Prize for another opera, Vabaduse laulik ("Bard of Freedom"), followed by a third prize in 1952 for the ballet Kalevipoeg. Kapp died in Tallinn, Estonia in 1996.

Operas
Tasuleegid (1945) 
Vabaduse laulik (1950) 
Talvemuinasjutt (1959) 
Tabamatu (1961) 
Assol (1965) 
Rembrandt (1975) 
An Unseen Wonder (1983)

Sources
Urve Lippus. The New Grove Dictionary of Opera, edited by Stanley Sadie (1992).  and 
Don Michael Randel. The Harvard Biographical Dictionary of Music (1996). 

1908 births
1996 deaths
People from Astrakhan
People from Astrakhan Governorate
Members of the Central Committee of the Communist Party of Estonia
Members of the Supreme Soviet of the Estonian Soviet Socialist Republic, 1947–1951
Members of the Supreme Soviet of the Estonian Soviet Socialist Republic, 1951–1955
Members of the Supreme Soviet of the Estonian Soviet Socialist Republic, 1959–1963
Fourth convocation members of the Supreme Soviet of the Soviet Union
Fifth convocation members of the Supreme Soviet of the Soviet Union
Estonian opera composers
Soviet opera composers
Soviet composers
Soviet male composers
20th-century classical composers
20th-century Estonian composers
Estonian music educators
20th-century male musicians
People's Artists of the USSR
People's Artists of the Estonian Soviet Socialist Republic
Stalin Prize winners
Heroes of Socialist Labour
Recipients of the Order of Lenin
Recipients of the Order of the Red Banner of Labour
Recipients of the Order of Friendship of Peoples
Burials at Metsakalmistu